The following are the records of Guatemala in Olympic weightlifting. Records are maintained in each weight class for the snatch lift, clean and jerk lift, and the total for both lifts by the Federación Nacional de Levantamiento de Pesas de Guatemala (FEDEPESAS).

Men

Women

References

External links
FEDEPESAS web site

Records
Guatemala
Olympic weightlifting
weightlifting